Golf was one of the many sports which was held at the 1982 Asian Games in New Delhi, India.

Medalists

Medal table

References

External links 
 Olympic Council of Asia

 
1982 Asian Games events
1982
Asian Games
1982 Asian Games